Loamneș is a commune located in Sibiu County, Transylvania, Romania. It is composed of six villages: Alămor, Armeni, Hașag, Loamneș, Mândra and Sădinca.

Natives
Ioan Barac (1776–1848), translator and poet
Aron Cotruș (1891–1961), poet and diplomat

References

Communes in Sibiu County
Localities in Transylvania